The Hans Ottesen House, at 202 S. 200 West in Manti, Utah, was built in c.1865-1875.  It was listed on the National Register of Historic Places in 1987.

It is a one-and-a-half-story pair-house.

It was built by, and home of, Hans Ottesen, who was born in Aalborg, Denmark, in 1834, and who emigrated to Utah in the 1850.  Ottesen was murdered at the house on November 2, 1884, by two men attempting to rob the house.  Ownership passed to his nephew Otto Ottesen, who served as sheriff in Manti.

References

Pair-houses
Houses on the National Register of Historic Places in Utah
Greek Revival architecture in Utah
Houses completed in 1865
Sanpete County, Utah